Karksi Landscape Conservation Area is a nature park situated in Viljandi County, Estonia.

Its area is 210 ha.

The protected area was designated in 2016 to protect Karksi or Halliste Ancient Valley along with its biodiversity.

References

Nature reserves in Estonia
Geography of Viljandi County